Herbert Reginald Taylor, II (born September 22, 1984) is a former American football offensive tackle. He was drafted by the Kansas City Chiefs in the sixth round of the 2007 NFL Draft. He played college football at Texas Christian.

Taylor has also been a member of the Denver Broncos, New York Giants, Jacksonville Jaguars, Green Bay Packers, and Las Vegas Locomotives.

Early years
Taylor was a letterman in football, baseball and track at Hightower High School in the Houston area before playing college football at Texas Christian University (TCU) in Fort Worth.

College career
At TCU, he started all 48 games of his college career, a school record.

Professional career

Las Vegas Locomotives
Taylor was signed by the Las Vegas Locomotives of the United Football League on November 1, 2010.

Jacksonville Jaguars
Taylor was signed by the Jacksonville Jaguars of the National Football League on September 10, 2012. Six days later, he started at right guard against the Houston Texans due to an injury to Eben Britton. 

He was released on October 27, 2012.

References

1984 births
Living people
Players of American football from Houston
American football offensive tackles
TCU Horned Frogs football players
Kansas City Chiefs players
Denver Broncos players
New York Giants players
Las Vegas Locomotives players
Green Bay Packers players
Jacksonville Jaguars players